İzmir University was a university in the Üçkuyular neighborhood of Karabağlar, a metropolitan district of İzmir, Turkey. It was established in 2007 by the Doğanata Education and Culture Foundation, which opened in 2008. On 23 July 2016, in the course of the 2016 Turkish purges, the university was closed by the Turkish government due to its alleged ties with the Gülen movement. The staff of the university rejected the accusations.

Faculties

Faculty of Economics and Administrative Sciences
The Faculty of Economics and Administrative Sciences consisted of four departments:
 Department of Business Administration
 Department of Political Science and Administration
 Department of International Relations
 Department of Trade and Finance

Faculty of Arts and Sciences
The Faculty of Arts and Sciences consisted of four departments:
 Department of American Culture and Literature
 Department of English Language Teaching
 Department of Psychology
 Department of Mathematics and Computer Sciences

Faculty of Engineering
The Faculty of Engineering consisted of four departments:
 Department of Computer Engineering 
 Department of Electronics and Telecommunication Engineering 
 Department of Software Engineering 
 Department of Industrial Engineering

Faculty of Architecture
The Faculty of Engineering consisted of two departments:
 Dept. of Architecture
 Dept. of Interior Arch. and Envir.

Faculty of Law

School of Health
The School of Health consisted of two departments:
 Department of Nursing
 Department of Physiotherapy and Rehabilitation

School of Foreign Languages

Vocational School
The university's vocational school offered courses in:
 Computer Programming
 Child Development
 Accounting and Tax App.
 Electronics and Tel. Tech.
 Tourism and Hotel Management
 Tourism and Travel Management

Institutes
 Institute of Engineering and Physical Sciences
 Institute of Social Sciences

References

External links
  

Private universities and colleges in Turkey
Universities and colleges in İzmir
Educational institutions established in 2007
2007 establishments in Turkey
Educational institutions shut down in the 2016 Turkish purges
Defunct universities and colleges in Turkey